The Sri Lankaramaya Buddhist Temple (also known as St Michael Buddhist Temple) is located at St. Michael's Road in Bendemeer, Singapore. The temple is the primary Sri Lanka Buddhist temple of its kind in Singapore. It is one of the Theravada Buddhist temples in Singapore which is founded years back from Buddhist monks from Sri Lanka. It is operated by the Singapore Sinhala Buddhist Association which was established in 1920.

Bodhi tree
A Bodhi tree (Ficus religiosa), can be seen in the compound of the temple, with four Buddha images placed on each direction.

Activities and management
The monks conduct regular Dhamma events including sutta discussions, meditation practices, chanting, pujas and blessings for devotees all year round. This temple is also a center for Sri Lankans to celebrate their cultural activities such as New Year in April. Other than that Buddhist festivals are celebrated in each year including Vesak Festival.

See also
 Wat Ananda Metyarama Thai Buddhist Temple
 Burmese Buddhist Temple
 Palelai Buddhist Temple
 Ti-Sarana Buddhist Association
 Aaloka Buddhist Center
 Bodhiraja Buddhist Society
 Vipassana Meditation Centre
 Buddhism in Singapore

References

External links
 Sri Lankaramaya Buddhist Temple-Singapore

Buddhist temples in Singapore
Sri Lankan diaspora in Asia